China T-Union, also known as TU, is a contactless transport card used in China. Holder of the card can use it to pay public transport fares in any covered service in China.

The Ministry of Transport approved development of the card and pilot projects in 2012. In 2015 the card was launched in Zhenjiang. In 2016, 110 cities supported the card and the following year this number was raised to 165. By 2019, 252 cities in China supported the card.

The design of the card varies by issuing region and TU itself does not issue any cards.

In 2018, the Hungarian government invited CTTIC to discuss potential implementation of the system in Hungarian public transport.

Transport services covered
As of August 2020, the card can be used in 245 cities in China as following:

References

Contactless smart cards
Transport in China
Fare collection systems in China